Ryszard Sobczak (born 2 November 1967) is a Polish fencer. He won a bronze medal in the team foil event at the 1992 Summer Olympics and a silver in the same event at the 1996 Summer Olympics.

References

1967 births
Living people
People from Zgorzelec
Polish male fencers
Olympic fencers of Poland
Fencers at the 1992 Summer Olympics
Fencers at the 1996 Summer Olympics
Fencers at the 2000 Summer Olympics
Olympic silver medalists for Poland
Olympic bronze medalists for Poland
Olympic medalists in fencing
Medalists at the 1992 Summer Olympics
Medalists at the 1996 Summer Olympics
Sportspeople from Lower Silesian Voivodeship
Universiade medalists in fencing
Universiade bronze medalists for Poland
Medalists at the 1995 Summer Universiade
21st-century Polish people
20th-century Polish people